"Sweet Cherry Wine" is a song by Tommy James and the Shondells from their 1969 album, Cellophane Symphony. It hit number seven on the Billboard Hot 100 and rose to number six on the Canadian charts. This psychedelic song was released at the height of psychedelia, right after one previous 'mind expanding' song by Tommy James and the Shondells, "Crimson and Clover", and before "Crystal Blue Persuasion".  It begins with the use of an organ, adds brass instruments, and ends with a solo flute that fades out at the end.  Adding to the feel of this form of music, this and other songs on the album included the then-new Moog synthesizer.

James, in an interview on the Christian Broadcasting Network (CBN) in 2010 stated that the song "was about the blood of Jesus" and acknowledged that many fans and peers assumed it was drug related.

The track was recorded at Broadway Sound Studios in Manhattan, New York, because at the time, James' regular studio was closed due to it being serviced and upgraded from 16 track to 24 track. He would resume working at Allegro Sound Studios after he recorded Sweet Cherry Wine.

It is also a protest song about the Vietnam War.

Chart performance

Weekly charts

See also
List of anti-war songs

References

1969 songs
1969 singles
Anti-war songs
Songs about Jesus
Songs of the Vietnam War
Songs written by Tommy James
Tommy James and the Shondells songs
Roulette Records singles